Daniel Frawley can refer to:
Dan Frawley (1882–1967), Australian rugby league footballer
Dan Frawley (ice hockey) (born 1962), Canadian ice hockey player
Danny Frawley (1963–2019), Australian rules footballer